Movitel is a mobile Telecommunication operator based in Mozambique, in Maputo. It has 12 subsidiaries distributed among 11 provinces, 127 district centers and more than 1,500 employees.
The project is a partnership between the Vietnamese company Viettel and Mozambique's SPI (Management and Investment). Its operation began after winning a public tender in 2010 to operate as another mobile telecommunications company in the Mozambican market. 
The company started building its infrastructure in 2011, at first with a total of 12,500 kilometers long fiber optic and 1,800 antennas that supported services in 2G and 3G.

Chronology
2010 - Movitel wins competition as the third operator in Mozambique;

2011 - Starts build its infrastructure across the country;

2012 - Launches officially its services;

2013 - Movitel receives the award for Competitive Strategy Leadership by the Company for Research and Consultancy Frost & Sullivan;

2014 - Movitel received the award for best operator in emerging countries; Movitel offers the INGC - National Institute of Disaster Management $200,000 to support the Chokwe district, devastated by the floods.

2015 - provides food baskets to the population of Zambézia devastated by floods, an estimated value of $200 000; It offers smart rooms to the Ministry of Education and Human Development, composed of a set of 200 computers and 12 projectors.

2016 - Received President of Socialist Republic of Vietnam, Trương Tấn Sang, using Video Conference system to make a meeting with all the Vietnamese who live in Mozambique.

See also 
 Viettel
 Lumitel
 Viettel Tanzania (Halotel)

References

External links

Info Daily
My beat
Mobile TV

Viettel
Telecommunications companies of Mozambique
Telecommunications companies established in 2012
Companies based in Maputo